Brandon Cronenberg (born January 10, 1980) is a Canadian director and screenwriter. He is the son of David Cronenberg and the brother of Caitlin Cronenberg. He is known for his science fiction horror films Antiviral (2012), Possessor (2020) and Infinity Pool (2023). He has won several accolades for his work.

Early life 
Cronenberg was born in Toronto, the son of filmmakers David Cronenberg and Carolyn Zeifman, and the brother of photographer Caitlin Cronenberg. He also has a half sister, Cassandra, from his father's first marriage. Cronenberg studied film at Toronto Metropolitan University in Toronto, Canada. He initially considered himself to be a "book nerd" growing up, who was interested in becoming a writer, painter, or musician. He came to realize that film contained all those elements and attended film school.

Career

Antiviral
In 2008, Cronenberg directed a short film titled Broken Tulips, about people who pay to be injected with viruses that were harvested from celebrities. Cronenberg has stated that the genesis of the film was a viral infection he once had. More precisely, the "central idea came to him in a fever dream during a bout of illness," wrote journalist Jill Lawless. It was further shaped when he saw an interview Sarah Michelle Gellar did on Jimmy Kimmel Live!; what struck him was when "she said she was sick and if she sneezed she'd infect the whole audience, and everyone just started cheering."

The short was adapted from a script he was working on for his first feature, Antiviral. Principal photography for the feature film adaptation took place in Hamilton, Ontario and in Toronto.

Antiviral debuted at the 2012 Cannes Film Festival in the Un Certain Regard section. Cronenberg and his father both screened films at that year's Cannes Film Festival, marking the first time a father and son screened films together in the festival's history.

Cronenberg re-edited the movie after the festival to make it tighter, trimming nearly six minutes from its running time. The revised version was first shown at the 2012 Toronto International Film Festival, where it tied for the award for Best Canadian First Feature Film. It later won the Citizen Kane Award for Best Debut Feature at the Sitges Film Festival.

Please Speak Continuously... and Possessor
In 2019, Cronenberg's short film Please Speak Continuously and Describe Your Experiences as They Come to You, starring Deragh Campbell, premiered at the Cannes Film Festival in the International Critics' Week section. The film won the Canal+ Grand Prize at L'Étrange Festival in Paris, and in December 2019 was included in TIFF's annual year-end Canada's Top Ten list for short films.

Cronenberg stated that visuals for Please Speak Continuously and Describe Your Experiences as They Come to You came from experiments he and his cinematographer Karim Hussain were doing for a feature film he was making called Possessor.

Possessor was released the following year, starring Christopher Abbott, Andrea Riseborough, Jennifer Jason Leigh, Tuppence Middleton and Sean Bean. It premiered at the 2020 Sundance Film Festival in the World Cinema Dramatic Competition section, where US distribution rights were picked up by Neon. The film won awards for Best Feature Length Film and Best Direction at the Sitges Film Festival that year, as well as the Grand Prize at the 2021 Gérardmer Film Festival. The film also received three nominations at the inaugural Critics' Choice Super Awards in the Science Fiction/Fantasy category, for Best Movie, Best Actor, and Best Actress. It was named to the Toronto International Film Festival's year-end Canada's Top Ten list for feature films.

Infinity Pool
At the 2019 Cannes Film Festival it was announced that Cronenberg's third feature would be a film called Infinity Pool, based on an original script of his. Infinity Pool stars Alexander Skarsgård and Mia Goth, and will play at both the 2023 Sundance Film Festival and Berlin International Film Festival. Neon are distributing in the US, with a commercial release set for January 27, 2023.

Upcoming work 
In 2021, it was announced that he would write and direct an adaptation of the J. G. Ballard novel Super-Cannes as a limited series for television.

Filmography

Film

Television

Short film 
 2008: Broken Tulips (short)
 2010: The Camera and Christopher Merk (short)
 2019: Please Speak Continuously and Describe Your Experiences as They Come to You (short)

References

External links
 

21st-century Canadian screenwriters
Canadian male screenwriters
Canadian people of Lithuanian-Jewish descent
Jewish Canadian writers
Film directors from Toronto
Toronto Metropolitan University alumni
Living people
Writers from Toronto
Horror film directors
Place of birth missing (living people)
Year of birth uncertain
1980 births